Gennadi (or Gennady) Ivanovich Gerasimov (Russian, Геннадий Иванович Герасимов, 3 March 1930, – 14 September 2010) was the last Soviet, and then Russian ambassador to Portugal from 1990 to 1995. Previously he was foreign affairs spokesman for Mikhail Gorbachev and press secretary to Eduard Shevardnadze.  

He is noted for coining the expression "Sinatra Doctrine" in reference to Gorbachev's non-intervention policy with respect to other members of the Warsaw Pact. When asked, during Mikhail Gorbachev's visit to Prague in 1987, what the difference was between the Prague Spring and perestroika, Gerasimov replied: "nineteen years".

He was recognized in 1990 as Communicator of the Year by the (American) National Association of Government Communicators (NAGC) 

He is mentioned in the Billy Bragg song "Moving the Goalposts".

References

1930 births
2010 deaths
Ambassadors of Russia to Portugal
Ambassadors of the Soviet Union to Portugal
Cold War diplomats

Recipients of the Order of Friendship of Peoples
Recipients of the Order of the Red Banner of Labour
Burials at Novodevichy Cemetery